Nagyiván is a village in Jász-Nagykun-Szolnok county, in the Northern Great Plain region of central Hungary.

Geography
It is one of the driest area in Hungary. The annual precipitation is about 520 mm. 
The village lies at the edge of the Hortobágy National Park (the first and biggest Hungarian national park, part of the world heritage). 
The inhabitants mainly work in the agricultural sector.

References

External links
 Official site in Hungarian

Populated places in Jász-Nagykun-Szolnok County